Zwick is a surname. The name is believed to originate from the town of Zwickau, Germany.

 Carola Zwick (born 1966), German product designer
 Charles Zwick (1926–2018), American government official
 Edward Zwick (born 1952), American filmmaker
 Jill Zwick (born 1944), American politician
 Joel Zwick (born 1942), American director
 Johannes Zwick (c. 1496–1542), German Reformer and hymnwriter
 Justin Zwick (born 1983), American football player
 Luis Zwick (born 1994), German footballer (Dundee United FC)
 Rebecca Zwick, American expert in educational assessment and college admissions
 Spencer J. Zwick, finance chair of Mitt Romney presidential campaign, 2012
 W. Craig Zwick (born 1947), American religious leader
 Uri Zwick, Israeli computer scientist

Other
 Zwick Roell Group, German manufacturing company
 Karloff–Zwick algorithm, a randomised approximation algorithm in computational complexity theory
 Zwick (card game), a north German card game for 2-4 players and the name of a sweep in that game